Douglassville is a census-designated place (CDP) in Amity Township in Berks County, Pennsylvania, United States. Douglassville is situated along U.S. Route 422 and Pennsylvania Route 724. Developments include the Amity Gardens subdivision, the West Ridge subdivision, the Briarwood subdivision, and the High Meadow subdivision. Douglassville also includes Cider Mill and the Woods Edge subdivision along Pennsylvania Route 562. As of the 2010 census, the population of the CDP was 448 residents.

History
Swedish pioneers were the first European settlers in present Berks County on land granted by William Penn. Swedish Lutheran Minister Andreas Rudman secured an order from William Penn on October 21, 1701 setting aside  up the Schuylkill, near Manatawny Creek, for members of his congregation. The boundaries of Amity Township are almost identical to the boundaries of the original area known as Swedes' tract. Morlatton Village, an early settlement which became part of what is now Douglassville, was Berks County's first settlement site along the Schuylkill River. The settlement later became the location of Old St. Gabriel's Episcopal Church or Old Swedes, founded in 1720 as the oldest church in Berks County.  The site also included the Mouns Jones House, built by Swedish settlers in 1716. The house is the oldest documented dwelling in Berks County.

Geography
Douglassville is located on the Schuylkill River and mainly upon its left bank. The CDP has a hot-summer humid continental climate (Dfa) and average monthly temperatures range from 30.7 °F in January to 75.5 °F in July.  The hardiness zone is 7a bordering upon 6b.

Demographics

Parks and recreation

Lake Drive Park and Recreation Area is in the Amity Gardens subdivision. Facilities include basketball and tennis courts, a skateboard park, a pavilion, and a picnic area.  Hill Road Park is located in the West Ridge subdivision, and includes a baseball field and a pavilion.  Monocacy Hill Preserve is an undeveloped park used for hiking and environmental education outside Douglassville. The park has trails going around the mountain.

Infrastructure
Klein Transportation provides bus service from Douglassville to Reading, Kutztown, Wescosville, Hellertown, and Midtown Manhattan in New York City.

References

Populated places in Berks County, Pennsylvania
Swedish-American culture in Pennsylvania
New Sweden